Georg H. Tengwall (6 April 1896 – 5 March 1954) was a Swedish sailor who competed in the 1920 Summer Olympics. He was a crew member of the Swedish boat Sif, which won the gold medal in the 40 m² class. Sif was in competition with only one other boat, "Elsie", also Swedish.

References

External links
profile

1896 births
1954 deaths
Swedish male sailors (sport)
Sailors at the 1920 Summer Olympics – 40m2 Skerry cruiser
Olympic sailors of Sweden
Olympic gold medalists for Sweden
Olympic medalists in sailing
Medalists at the 1920 Summer Olympics